Firebug may refer to:

Science and technology
 Pyrrhocoris apterus, commonly referred as the firebug, an insect of the family Pyrrhocoridae
 Firebug (software), a web development tool

Entertainment
 Firebug (comics), the name of three DC Comics supervillains
 Firebug (video game), a 1982 computer game for the Apple II computer
 Firebugs (video game), a 2002 game for the PlayStation
 The Fire Raisers (play), 1953 German play by Max Frisch also known in English as The Firebugs

Other uses
 Arsonist, a fire-based vandal
 Pyromaniac, an impulse-control disorder related to fascination with fire
 Firebug (dinghy), class of sailing dinghy